Lestkov is a municipality and village in Tachov District in the Plzeň Region of the Czech Republic. It has about 400 inhabitants.

Administrative parts
Villages and hamlets of Domaslav, Hanov, Stan, Vrbice u Bezdružic and Vysoké Jamné are administrative parts of Lestkov.

References

Villages in Tachov District